Devudu is a 1997 Telugu-language drama film produced by A. Gopinath, M. Venkatrao and C. Krishna Rao under the Sri Chitra Creations banner, directed by Ravi Raja Pinisetty. It stars Nandamuri Balakrishna, Ramya Krishna, Ruchitha Prasad  and music composed by Sirpy.

Plot
The film begins with a couple walking away leaving their newborn baby in a temple near a village. Since he is congenital abnormal and they are unable to witness his death. However, with the blessing of the Goddess, the child survives. Rayudu a benignant and forefront of the region, adopts him and calls as Devudu. Years roll by, and Devudu a callow simpleton with a golden heart grows up under the pampering of the village and becomes their heartthrob. However, he detests and runs off by the name of marriage because he believes that his parents deserted him owing to it. Ganga Raju a sly begrudges Rayudu as he ostracized his sibling Linga Raju for marrying twice and waiting for an opportunity to avenge.

Once, on his visit to the city Devudu saves a girl Madhavi from the goons and they befriend her. Now it’s time for the general election in their constituency, Sarweswara Rao MLA who accorded 4 times again seeks Rayudu’s support which is denied as he has lost their credence. Hence, Sarweswara Rao employs a stratagem by detaining his daughter Shanti under the aegis of Rayudu and proclaims to have her home following the completion of his allegiance. He also requests Rayudu to conceal the agreement before Shanti. In those days, Shanti endears innocence and divinity of Devudu.

Despite, triumphing in elections Sarweswara Rao fails to prove his fidelity when the village decides to penalize Shanti. So, Devudu absconds to the city with Shanti. The next, Shanti gets stunned to know the fact and understands the foul play. In reality, she is Sarweswara Rao’s first-time daughter which is an unknown fact to the world. One day, fortuitously, Shanti comes forward and compels him to accept, that he utilized her for his political gain. Here, cognizant of the status quo, Sarweswara Rao makes the Police ride out of their hotel. To fight back Shanti forces Devudu to tie a wedding chain on her neck. Being unaware of its sanctity he does so, assuming it as an omnipotent locket. Afterward, they plan to kidnap Sarweswara Rao’s original daughter who is not anyone else other than Madhavi. Just, she realizes the vileness of her father, embraces Shanti, and voluntarily proceeds to the village.

At that time, Sarweswara Rao hits a jackpot to become Chief Minister with the support of MLA Pundarikakshaiah, conditionally, to knit Madhavi with his son. Hence, Sarweswara Rao sends his henchmen to retrieve his daughter by eliminating Devudu. To get out of the quandary, Devudu ties the wedding chain to Madhavi too which coerces Sarweswara Rao to accomplish his covenant. Getting wind of Devudu’s wedlock with two, Ganga Raju accuses him before Panchayat and when Rayudu is about to verdict the entire village stands in favor of Devudu. Meanwhile, Devudu runs away and hides in the temple as he is mystified where he gets normal with the illusion appearance of the Goddess. In tandem, Sarweswara Rao onslaughts abduct Rayudu & Madhavi and forcibly tries to perform her espousal. At last, Devudu ceases baddies and protects them. Finally, the movie ends with Shanti sacrificing her life while guarding Devudu and uniting him with Madhavi.

Cast

Nandamuri Balakrishna as Devudu
Ramya Krishna as Shanti
Ruchitha Prasad as Madhavi
Satyanarayana as Rayudu
Allu Ramalingaiyah as Babu Rao
Pundarikakshiyah as M. L. A. Pundarikakshiyah
Kota Srinivasa Rao as Ganga Raju
Raja Krishna Murthy as M. L. A. Sarweswara Rao
Gajar Khan as Sarweswara Rao's brother-in-law
Maharshi Raghava as Pundarikakshiyah's Son
Sivaji Raja as Bangaru Raju 
Narayana Rao as Suraiah
Garimalla Visweswara Rao as Shocko Shekar
Junior Relangi as Kavi
Annapurna as Durgamma
Rama Prabha as Babu Rao's wife
Sana as Lakshmi
Raja Kumari as Rani
Y. Vijaya as Ganga Raju's wife

Soundtrack

Music composed by Sirpy. Music released on T-Series Music Company.

Reception 
The film was reviewed by Zamin Ryot. a critic from Andhra Today wrote that "'Devudu' is yet another meaningless movie with the pranks of a mentally immature person. The role is very uninspiring and is sure to disappoint Bala Krishna's fans".

References

External links
 

1997 films
1990s Telugu-language films
Indian action drama films
Films directed by Ravi Raja Pinisetty
Films scored by Sirpy
1990s action drama films
Telugu names
Telugu given names